Deore XT is a mountain and touring bike groupset first introduced by Shimano in 1983. It was Shimano's first mountain bike groupset, based on their existing Deore touring groupset, and it consisted of a triple-, double- or single chainring crankset, front and rear derailleurs, handlebar-mounted "finger" shifters, cantilever brakes, and large-flange hubs. Since then, it has become their "second-tier" offering, the list of components has expanded to include hydraulic disc brakes, a complete wheelset, a chain, and clipless pedals, and it is offered in silver or black finish.

Model history 
The groupset was designated by model numbers M7xx; beginning with M700, and ran to M780. Touring groupsets were designated by model numbers T7xx. Current groupsets are designated by model numbers M8100 and T8000.

M700 1983 friction (Deer Head)
M730 1987 6-speed
M732 1989 7-speed
M735 1992 7-speed
M737 1993 8-speed
M739 1995 8-speed
M750 1999 9-speed (first groupsets sold already in 1998, these sets are code-stamped WK onwards)
M760 2003 9-speed
M770 2008 9/10-speed
 Rear derailleur: introduction of Shadow low-profile design, which reduced the risk of damage from side hazards. Shimano has released four models of rear derailleur in M770 lineup:
 RD-M770, 9 speed, reversed spring
 RD-M771, 9 speed
 RD-M772, 9 speed, Shadow profile 
 RD-M773, 10 speed, Shadow profile
Front Derailleur:
 FD-M770, 9 speed
M780 2011 10-speed
Shifting Lever:
SL-M780-B-IR, 10 speed, I-spec B
SL-M780-B-IL, 2/3 speed, I-spec B
SL-M780-R, 10 speed, clamp band
SL-M780-L, 2/3 speed, clamp band
Front Derailleur:
FD-M785, 2 speed, clamp band, top swing, dual-pull
FD-M785-E2, 2 speed, e-type, top swing, dual-pull
FD-M786, 2 speed, clamp band, down swing, dual-pull (top-pull exclusive)
FD-M786-D, 2 speed, direct mount, down swing, dual-pull (top-pull exclusive)
FD-M780-A-B, 3 speed, clamp band, top swing, dual-pull
FD-M781-A-B, 3 speed, clamp band, down swing, dual-pull
FD-M781-A-D, 3 speed, direct mount, down swing, top-pull
FD-M780-A-E, 3 speed, e-type, top swing, down-pull
Rear derailleur: introduction of Shadow Plus technology, which added a switchable clutch used to stabilize chain tension. Shimano has released two versions of the rear derailleur - M781 (without clutch) and M786 (with clutch). Both versions were sold in two cage length options - GS (medium) and SGS (long, 95 mm between centres of jockey wheels axis).
RD-M781-SGS, 10 speed, Shadow, long cage (total capacity 43T)
RD-M786-SGS, 10 speed, Shadow Plus, long cage (total capacity 43T)
RD-M781-GS, 10 speed, Shadow, medium cage (total capacity 35T)
RD-M786-GS, 10 speed, Shadow Plus, medium cage (total capacity 35T)
Brake Lever:
BL-M785-B, hydraulic disc brake, open clamp band, compatible with I-spec B
T780 2011 10-speed
M8000 2015 11-speed
Shifting Lever:
SL-M8000-R, 11 speed, clamp band
SL-M8000-L, 2/3 speed, clamp band
SL-M8000-IR, 11 speed, I-spec II
SL-M8000-IL, 2/3 speed, I-spec II
SL-M8000-B-IR, 11 speed, I-spec B
SL-M8000-B-IL, 2/3 speed, I-spec B
Front Derailleur:
FD-M8000-D, 3 speed, direct mount, side swing, front-pull
FD-M8000-E, 3 speed, e-type, side swing, front-pull
FD-M8000-H, 3 speed, high clamp band, side swing, front-pull
FD-M8000-L, 3 speed, low clamp band, side swing, front-pull
FD-M8020-D, 2 speed, direct mount, side swing, front-pull
FD-M8020-E, 2 speed, e-type, side swing, front-pull
FD-M8020-H, 2 speed, high clamp band, side swing, front-pull
FD-M8020-L, 2 speed, low clamp band, side swing, front-pull
FD-M8025-H, 2 speed, high clamp band, down swing, dual-pull (top-pull exclusive)
FD-M8025-L, 2 speed, low clamp band, top swing, dual-pull (down-pull exclusive)
FD-M8025-D, 2 speed, direct mount, down swing, dual-pull (top-pull exclusive)
FD-M8025-E, 2 speed, e-type, top swing, dual-pull (top-pull exclusive)
Rear Derailleur:
RD-M8000-SGS, 11 speed, Shadow Plus, long cage (total capacity 47T)
RD-M8000-GS, 11 speed, Shadow Plus, medium cage (total capacity 39T)
Brake Lever:
BL-M8000, hydraulic disc brake, open clamp band, compatible with I-spec II
T8000 2016 10-speed
M8100 2019 12-speed
Shifting Lever:
SL-M8100-R, 12 speed, clamp band
SL-M8100-IR, 12 speed, I-spec EV
SL-M8100-L, 2 speed, clamp band
SL-M8100-IL, 2 speed, I-spec EV
Front Derailleur:
FD-M8100-D, 2 speed, direct mount, side swing, front-pull
FD-M8100-E, 2 speed, e-type, side swing, front-pull
FD-M8100-M, 2 speed, clamp band, side swing, front-pull
Brake Lever:
BL-M8100, hydraulic disc brake, open clamp band, compatible with I-spec EV

References

Bicycle parts